The Academic Competition Federation (ACF) is an organization, founded as the Academic Competition Foundation in 1991, that runs a national championship for collegiate quiz bowl as well as other tournaments.

History
During the mid-1980s, several schools began to prepare for College Bowl's regional and national tournaments by holding independent invitationals, during which players became unsatisfied with College Bowl's questions. Several scandals soon emerged, in which the 1988 College Bowl Regionals were found to have recycled nearly all of their questions from the 1982 College Bowl Regionals, independent tournaments were threatened with lawsuits from College Bowl, and the 1983 and 1985 College Bowl National Championship Tournaments were cancelled.

In response to these concerns, the University of Maryland and University of Tennessee stopped participating in College Bowl, followed a few years later by the Georgia Institute of Technology and a steadily increasing number schools.

In the fall of 1990, the then-coach of the University of Tennessee team Carol Guthrie joined with a few University of Maryland team members to found the Academic Competition Foundation. In 1991, they held the first ACF Nationals, which was won by the host Tennessee team over Georgia Tech. While departing from College Bowl's structure, the tournament initially included a few elements carried over from College Bowl games. Those elements were later removed. No ACF Nationals tournament was held in 1992, but, beginning in 1993, Regionals and Nationals tournaments were held every year. By 1996, ACF Nationals was attracting 40 teams, but after the 1997 Nationals, Carol Guthrie announced that she and co-founder Jim Dendy were each resigning, and that ACF would go defunct.

In 1996, a new company called National Academic Quiz Tournaments (1996) was formed. NAQT was more organized than ACF in several respects, yet also included College Bowl-like features in their questions. University of Virginia student Andrew Yaphe thus organized the Academic Competition Federation to continue running the Regional and National tournaments along with John Sheahan and David Hamilton. The 1999 Nationals saw the first presentation of the Dr. N. Gordon Carper Lifetime Achievement Award, which recognizes individuals "for meritorious services in sustaining and enriching collegiate academic competitions."

Following the rise to popularity of NAQT, the decline of College Bowl, and longstanding complaints about the difficulty of ACF, a decision was made in 2001 to focus on the accessibility of Academic Competition Federation tournaments. Despite those efforts, however, only sixteen teams attended ACF Nationals in 2001, and the future of the tournament seemed tenuous. Thus, a third, easier tournament, ACF Fall, was conceived by University of Kentucky player Kelly McKenzie, star player of the University of Kentucky team, and held in November 2001. This three-tournament lineup continued to 2009, then again from 2011 to 2019, with a fourth, intermediate difficulty, "ACF Winter" tournament held as part of the current circuit, as well as in 2009-10

Format

An ACF game consists of twenty ten-point tossups with thirty-point bonuses, a format now widely used by various collegiate and high school quiz bowl tournaments.

The ACF finals format is unique in that it involves awarding a tournament title outright to a team which is two or more games ahead in the standings of the second-place team at the end of the tournament proper. If two teams are tied, a one-game winner-take-all final is played. An advantaged final of up to two games is played if the first-place team is exactly one game ahead of the second-place team.

ACF Tournaments

Overview 
ACF tournaments follow the packet submission model, where editors organize the writing project and teams submit questions which will be used in competition. Depending on the experience of the players on a given team, that team may need to submit questions that will either comprise the entirety of a 20-tossup, 20-bonus packet, or that will be combined by editors with the question submissions of one or more teams to produce a full packet.

ACF Fall 
ACF Fall is intended to be an easy college tournament for new college players or players with limited high school quiz bowl experience. ACF fall is played concurrently each year throughout the United States and internationally in Canada and the United Kingdom. With over 200 teams participating across all sites, ACF fall is the most-widely played college set in a given year. ACF Fall follows the packet-submission model.

ACF Winter 
In 2009 and 2010, ACF organized the ACF Winter tournament. The target difficulty for ACF Winter was that of a regular college tournament, i.e. more difficult than ACF Fall and easier than ACF Regionals. In February 2020, ACF announced that it will be releasing ACF Winter again for the 2020-2021 season onwards.

ACF Regionals 
ACF Regionals is the regular-difficulty (more difficult that ACF Fall) college tournament by which teams may qualify for ACF Nationals. In 2020, there were 11 concurrent ACF Regionals tournaments in the United States, 2 in Canada, and one in the United Kingdom. ACF Regionals follows the packet-submission model.

ACF Nationals 
ACF Nationals is the final ACF tournament each season, and it has been run for more than 25 years. With the 48 strongest teams in the United States, Canada, and United Kingdom competing together at a single tournament location, the questions at ACF Nationals are more difficult than those at ACF Regionals. ACF Nationals does not follow the same packet-submission model as ACF Fall and ACF Regionals. Most of the questions are written by the tournament's editors, but teams may submit questions for a discounted entry fee.

Past ACF Tournaments

Early Autumn Collegiate Novice 
EACN was an ACF-sponsored collegiate novice tournament written and competed on from 2010 to 2013. With stricter eligibility requirements than ACF Fall, EACN was intended to be an introduction to collegiate quiz bowl for players entirely new with quiz bowl.

ACF Nationals results

Carper Award recipients
Dr. N. Gordon Carper Lifetime Achievement Award was established in 1999 to honor individuals for meritorious services in sustaining and enriching collegiate academic competitions. The award is presented annually to a member of the quizbowl community who exhibits the kind of dedication to and long-term support of academic competitions as exemplified by career of Dr. Carper. Beginning in 2019, ACF empowered a committee of former Carper winners who are also ACF members to select a second winner. 

 1999: Dr. N. Gordon Carper, coach at Berry College
 2000: Dr. Carol Guthrie, former coach at the University of Tennessee
 2001: Dr. Robert Meredith, coach at the Georgia Institute of Technology
 2002: Not presented
 2003: Eric Hillemann, coach at Carleton College
 2004: Don Windham, ACF co-founder and Gaius Stern, of the University of California, Berkeley
 2005: Charlie Steinhice, coach at the University of Tennessee at Chattanooga
 2006: R. Robert Hentzel, president of National Academic Quiz Tournaments
 2007: Andrew Yaphe, player at the University of Chicago
 2008: Chris Sewell, developer of the SQBS statistics program
 2009: Ezequiel Berdichevsky, ACF editor
 2010: Subash Maddipoti, former player at the University of Chicago and the University of Illinois
 2011: Seth Teitler, former player at the University of Chicago and the University of California, Berkeley
 2012: Jeff Hoppes, former player at Princeton University and the University of California, Berkeley
 2013: Matt Weiner, tournament organizer and question set editor
 2014: Susan Ferrari, former player at the University of Chicago
 2015: Jerry Vinokurov, former player at the University of California, Berkeley and Brown University
 2016: Andrew Hart, former player at the University of Minnesota
 2017: Jonathan Magin, former player at the University of Maryland
 2018: Mike Bentley, former player at the University of Maryland and the University of Washington
 2019: Rob Carson, former player at the University of Minnesota; and Kelly McKenzie, former player at the University of Kentucky and creator of ACF Fall
 2020: Alex Damisch, former player at Lawrence University; and Mike Sorice, former player at the University of Illinois
 2021: Matt Bollinger, former player at the University of Virginia and current player at Georgia Tech; and Jim Dendy, former player and coach at Georgia Tech
 2022: Matt Jackson, former player at Yale University and current player at the University of Chicago; and Chris Borglum, coach at Valencia College

See also
 College Bowl
 National Academic Quiz Tournaments

References

External links
 Official website

Student quiz competitions
1991 establishments in the United States
Recurring events established in 1991